Grzybów  is a village in the administrative district of Gmina Bogoria, within Staszów County, Świętokrzyskie Voivodeship, in south-central Poland.

The village has a population of  277.

Demography 
According to the 2002 Poland census, there were 282 people residing in Grzybów village, of whom 50.7% were male and 49.3% were female. In the village, the population was spread out, with 22.3% under the age of 18, 35.8% from 18 to 44, 19.5% from 45 to 64, and 22.3% who were 65 years of age or older.
 Figure 1. Population pyramid of village in 2002 – by age group and sex

References

Villages in Staszów County